The Ministry of Agriculture of Azerbaijan is an Azerbaijani governmental agency within the Cabinet of Azerbaijan in charge of regulation of the economic activity in the agricultural sector of the country with a purpose of increasing the sector's production capacity. Agriculture is Azerbaijan's second most important natural resource playing a significant role in the country's economy. The ministry is headed by Inam Karimov.

History

The ministry overseeing agricultural activity was first established on May 28, 1918 with declaration of independence of Azerbaijan Democratic Republic as the Ministry of Cultivation and Labor. On October 15, 1918 the name was changed to the Ministry of the State Property and Cultivation and after the establishment of Soviet rule in Azerbaijan in 1920, it was renamed to the State Land Commissariat. In 1986 the ministry was transformed into the State Committee on Agrarian Economy. 
In 1992, after restoration of independence of Azerbaijan Republic, the ministry was re-established as the Ministry of Agriculture and Food. Finally, in 1993, the name was changed to its current.

The Ministry of Agriculture pursues public policy in the following areas:

 development of production and processing of agricultural products;
 providing the necessary services and information support to producers of agricultural products;
 land reclamation and water management, veterinary medicine, plant quarantine and effective land use;
 implementing a unified scientific and technical policy in the agricultural sector, organizing the development and implementation of priority research programs in crop production and livestock production;
 ensuring the country's food security;
 economic and social development of villages and rural areas.

Organization

As per the Presidential Decree No. 467 dated October 23, 2004 with the purpose of increasing the agricultural capacity of the country, the ministry focuses on development of production and processing of the agricultural products; provision of information to producers of the agricultural products; melioration and water economy, veterinary, plant quarantine and favorable use of the soil; implementation of unique scientific-technical policy, organization of first priority programs on plant growing and animal breeding; ensuring supply food security in the country; economic and social development of the villages. The ministry holds trade and investment conferences in order to attract foreign investment into the sector and promote Azerbaijani foods in the world markets. In 2007, it held an Azerbaijan Food and Agriculture Trade Mission in the United States organized by the U.S.-Azerbaijan Chamber of Commerce.

International Cooperation 

Ministry of Agriculture of the Republic of Azerbaijan is closely cooperating with a number of international organizations, as well as the countries with great experience in the field of agriculture for study of experience of the leading organizations and countries, establishment and expanding legal frameworks for different directions of agrarian sector jointly by other countries, preparing and implementing international projects. Note that, the intergovernmental commission on cooperation with foreign countries plays very important role in development of bilateral cooperation between the Republic of Azerbaijan and other countries.
Between 1994 and 2004 the Ministry implemented different projects and programs such as "Organizational assistance to the Ministry of Agriculture", "Aid to families and commercial farmers", "Privatization of the sector of foodstuff distribution in Azerbaijan", "Regional Agrarian Reform-1", "Assistance in bank activity of the agrarian sphere, organization of village credit entities", "Unions on assistance to Regional Pilot Agrobusiness", "Establishment of exemplary private agricultural enterprises" and "Development and Crediting of the Agriculture", "Support of private initiatives in the Agriculture", "Consult on Agrarian policy", "Development of potato seedage in Azerbaijan and establishment of its base", "Establishment of services on artificial fertilization" and "Increase of foodstuffs in Azerbaijan-2KR", "Inventory of plant cover and soil use in Azerbaijan with the method of far-distance probe", "Strengthening of phytosanitary services", "Strengthening of diagnosis, struggle and control over intensive infected animal diseases", "Vaccine supply for the assistance to the veterinary", "Project of the development of mountainous and high mountainous regions",  "Food security". These projects have been implemented by support of World Bank, GTZ Germanic Government, by the government of Japan,  Organisation of Food and Agriculture of the UN, International Fund on Agricultural Development (IFAD).

Functions of the Ministry 
The Ministry is responsible for:

 implementing state policy in the agrarian field
 monitoring the compliance with legislation in the agrarian area
 taking part in the preparation and implementation of state policy in the field of infrastructure development and in the preparation of regulatory and legal acts
 carrying out public policy in the field of land reclamation and water management, irrigation
 running a common scientific and technical policy in the agrarian sphere
 carrying out the state policy in the field of food security of the country
 providing veterinary service, supervising the production of safe food products and raw materials
 ensuring plant protection and quarantine in the territory of the Republic of Azerbaijan
 pursuing a policy of granting loans in the agricultural area to the socio-economic development of rural areas
 organize accounting and statistical returns
 perform other duties set out by the legislation of the Republic of Azerbaijan

Reforms

As a result of the first Nagorno-Karabakh War, Azerbaijan's agricultural sector went into a recession which led the leadership to pass three lawsAbout the agrarian reforms and About reforms in state farms and collective farms on February 18, 1995 and About land reform on July 16, 1995. According to the Presidential Decree from October 23, 2004 which also included establishment of "Agroleasing" Open Stock Company providing leasing of equipment and funding, AZN 100 billion and AZN 150 billion were allocated in 2005 and 2006 to the sector. As a result, in comparison to statistics in 1995, grain growing increased by 2.3 times in 2004, potatoes by 5.9 times, water melon products by 8.5, vegetables by 2.5, fruit and berry by 1.3, meat by 1.9, milk by 1.4, eggs by 1.5, the quantity of the cattle heads by 1.3, the quantity of sheep and goats by 1.6 times.

See also
Cabinet of Azerbaijan
Agriculture in Azerbaijan

References

Azerbaijan
Azerbaijan
Agriculture